Independence Park is a park in Tel Aviv, Israel located along the coast near the Hilton Tel Aviv hotel.

History
The first trees were planted on Israel’s first Independence Day in 1949. The official opening was in 1952. In 2009, the park was renovated as part of Tel Aviv’s centennial anniversary celebrations.

The site on which the park now stands was formerly a limestone hill. During the British Mandate, part of the area was used as a military base. The Etzel ship Altalena was fired upon from this location. A Hasmonean citadel were discovered in the southern portion of the park.

The park was once known as a meeting place for cruising and homosexual encounters. 

The park was designed by landscape architect Zvi Dekel.

Landmarks
Among the sculptures in the park are two  bronze statues of King Asa of Judah and King Yehoshafat of Israel overlooking the sea. A tall monument resembling a bird with a broken wing commemorates Independence War pilots David Sprinzak and Mati Sukenik.

References

Parks in Tel Aviv
LGBT culture in Tel Aviv